The 2018 South Florida Bulls football team represented the University of South Florida (USF) in the 2018 NCAA Division I FBS football season. They played their home games at Raymond James Stadium in Tampa, Florida, and were led by second-year head coach Charlie Strong. The Bulls competed as members of the East Division of the American Athletic Conference. They finished the season 7–6, 3–5 in AAC play to finish in fourth place in the East Division. They were invited to the Gasparilla Bowl where they lost to Marshall.

The 2018 Bulls became the first team in college football history to start a season 7–0 and lose their final six games.

Previous season
The Bulls finished the 2017 season with a record of 10–2. After ending the regular season with a record of 9-2, 6-2 in the AAC, the Bulls were invited to the Birmingham Bowl, where they defeated Texas Tech 38-34.

Preseason
The Bulls replaced 11 starters from a 10-2 season in 2017. One of the biggest storylines of the offseason was the addition of graduate transfer Blake Barnett who was named the starting quarterback following stints at Alabama and Arizona State.

Award watch lists
Listed in the order that they were released

AAC media poll
The AAC media poll was released on July 24, 2018, with the Bulls predicted to finish in second place in the AAC East Division.

Schedule

Schedule Source:

Game summaries

Elon

Georgia Tech

at Illinois

East Carolina

at Massachusetts

at Tulsa

UConn

at Houston

Tulane

at Cincinnati

at Temple

UCF

Marshall (Gasparilla Bowl)

Rankings

References

South Florida
South Florida Bulls football seasons
South Florida Bulls football